D. R. Fraser Taylor,  is Chancellor's Distinguished Research Professor of International Affairs Geography and Environmental Studies at Carleton University, Canada and a Fellow of the Royal Society of Canada. Taylor studies applications of cartography to development, including international development. He is best known for his work on Cybercartography.

Research 
Taylor has engaged in research and development in the theory and practice of Cybercartography; electronic atlases, interactive cartographic systems and visualization; the preservation and archiving of geospatial data, including Case Study 06, Cybercartographic Atlas of Antarctica, with the InterPARES Project (Phase 2); and Canada’s international policies toward developing nations.

Honours  
In 2008, Dr. Taylor was elected a Fellow of the Royal Society of Canada. In 2013, he was awarded the Carl Mannerfelt Gold Medal by the International Cartographic Association, for which he served as President from 1987 to 1995. In 2014, Dr. Taylor was awarded the prestigious Killam Prize for the Social Sciences for his work in developing Cybercartography. He was appointed to the Order of Canada in 2021.

Selected book publications 
Taylor, D. R.F., Series General Editor, Modern Cartography Series. Amsterdam: Elsevier, 1991-Present
Taylor, D. R. F., ed., Anonby, E., Murasugi, K., assoc. eds.Further Developments in the Theory and Practice of Cybercartography: International Dimensions and Language Mapping. Amsterdam: Elsevier, 2019.
Pyne, S. and Taylor, D. R. F., Cybercartography in a Reconciliation Community: Engaging Intersecting Perspectives. Amsterdam: Elsevier, 2019.
Taylor, D. R. F., ed., Lauriault, T., assoc. ed. Developments in the Theory and Practice of Cybercartography. Amsterdam: Elsevier, 2014. 
Taylor, D. R. F., ed. Cybercartography: Theory and Practice. Amsterdam: Elsevier, 2005.
Taylor, D. R. F., ed. Policy Issues in Modern Cartography. Amsterdam: Elsevier, 1998.
MacEachren, A. and Taylor, D. R. F., eds. Visualization in Modern Cartography. New York: Elsevier, 1994. 
Taylor, D. R. F., ed., series ed. Education and Training in Contemporary Cartography. Chichester: Wiley, 1985. 
Taylor, D. R. F., and Stohr, W., eds. Development from Above or Below: The Dialectics of Regional Planning in Developing Countries. London: Wiley. 1981.

References 

Canadian geographers
Cartography
Alumni of the University of Edinburgh
Academic staff of Carleton University
Fellows of the Royal Society of Canada
Living people
Year of birth missing (living people)
Officers of the Order of Canada